HMS Inconstant was an unarmored, iron-hulled, screw frigate built for the Royal Navy in the late 1860s. Upon completion in 1869, she was the fastest warship in the world and was assigned to the Channel Squadron. Two years later the ship was transferred to the Detached Squadron for a brief time before she was paid off into reserve in 1872. Inconstant was recommissioned in 1880 for service with the Flying Squadron that circumnavigated the world in 1880–82. On the return voyage, the ship was diverted to Egypt during the Anglo-Egyptian War of 1882 and played a minor role supporting operations ashore. She was reduced to reserve again after her return and was served as an accommodation ship in 1897. Inconstant was hulked in 1904 and became a training ship in 1906. She continued in that role, under a variety of names, until she was sold for scrap in 1955 and subsequently broken up, the second-to-last surviving Pembroke-built warship in existence.

Design and description
Inconstant was the first of an intended six fast, unarmoured, iron-hulled, frigates designed by the British Admiralty's Chief Constructor, Sir Edward Reed, in response to the fast, wooden American Wampanoag-class frigates. Only three were built, however, as the American ships proved to be flawed enough to pose no real threat and the British ships were very expensive. Inconstant displaced  and had a tonnage of 4,066 tons burthen. She carried a complement of 600 officers and ratings. Inconstant was a good seaboat and a steady gun platform.

The ship had a single John Penn and Sons two-cylinder trunk steam engine that drove a  propeller.

To improve her performance under sail, her propeller could be hoisted into the hull and her funnels lowered to reduce drag.

When completed the ship was more heavily armed than all but two of the twenty-four British ironclads afloat. Inconstants main armament consisted of ten rifled muzzle-loading (RML)  guns on the main deck in the traditional broadside layout. Her secondary armament of six RML  guns was mounted on the upper deck, with two guns positioned in the bow as chase guns. The guns fired a  shell that could pierce  of armour.

Construction and career

Inconstant, the fifth ship of her name to serve in the Royal Navy, was laid down on 27 November 1866 at Pembroke Dockyard, Wales. The ship was launched on 25 March 1872 by Lady Muriel Campbell, daughter of John Campbell, 2nd Earl Cawdor. Inconstant was transferred to Portsmouth Dockyard to finish fitting out and was commissioned on 12 August 1869 by Captain Elphinstone D'Oyly D'Auvergne Aplin for duty with the Channel Squadron. He was relieved by Captain Charles Waddilove on 13 September 1870. The following year the ship was assigned to the Detached Squadron, commanded by Rear-Admiral Frederick Seymour, which visited ports in Scandinavia after Inconstant joined them at Gibraltar, finally arriving at Spithead on 11 October 1871. The ship was paid off in 1872 and spent the next eight years in reserve.

She was recommissioned in 1880 and was commanded by Captain Lord Walter Kerr from 5 February to 11 March. During this time, Inconstant served as the flagship of Vice-Admiral Seymour of the Mediterranean Fleet as she ferried replacement crews to that fleet. From August 1880 to October 1882, Inconstant was assigned to the reconstituted Detached Squadron, this time as the flagship, first of Rear-Admiral Richard Meade, 4th Earl of Clanwilliam until he was got sick in Hong Kong, and then from 6 December 1881 to 17 October 1882 of Rear-Admiral Sir Francis Sullivan. Inconstants captain at this time was Captain Charles Penrose-Fitzgerald. The Detached Squadron left Spithead on 17 October 1880 to circumnavigate the world and returned two years later. It is claimed that on 11 July 1881 (or 11 June 1881), Prince George of Wales (later King George V of the United Kingdom) sighted a phantom ship whilst aboard Inconstant between Melbourne and Sydney. Two other ships, Tourmaline and Cleopatra, also reported seeing the phantom ship. Just after arriving in the Falkland Islands, the squadron was ordered to Simonstown, South Africa, for possible service in the First Boer War of 1880–81, but hostilities had already ended by the time that it arrived. On the return voyage, the frigate caught fire; it was stopped by flooding all of the after compartments. Shortly afterward, the squadron was diverted to Egypt after the start of the Anglo-Egyptian War of 1882; they arrived after the Bombardment of Alexandria on 11 July and some of Inconstants crew were landed to participate in operations ashore.

The ship was reduced to reserve again after their return on 16 October 1882. She became an accommodation ship for the overflow from the barracks at Devonport in 1897. Inconstant was taken out of service in 1904 and became a gunnery training ship in June 1906, assigned to the boy's training establishment Impregnable. She was renamed Impregnable III in 1907, then Defiance IV in January 1922 after she was transferred to the torpedo training school at Plymouth, Defiance, and then Defiance II in December 1930. The ship was sold for scrap in September 1955 and arrived at the breaker's yard in Belgium on 4 April 1956 for demolition, when she was the second-to-last Welsh-built naval vessel afloat.

Footnotes

References
 
 
 Colby, C. B. (1959). Strangely Enough, Sydney: Oak Tree Press

External links

 Inconstant on Battleships and Cruisers
 The Flying Squadron
 Richard Charles Francis Meade on-line biography
 Frederick Beauchamp Paget Seymour on-line biography
  Sir Francis Sullivan on-line biography

Steam frigates of the Royal Navy
Ships built in Pembroke Dock
1868 ships